A Travis Tritt Christmas: Loving Time of the Year is the first Christmas music album by American country music singer Travis Tritt. It was released September 29, 1992, via Warner Bros. Records. The album includes a mix of traditional songs, cover songs and new material.

Content
This album includes three covers of country Christmas songs. "Christmas in My Hometown" was originally recorded by Sonny James on his 1966 album My Christmas Dream. "Santa Looked a Lot Like Daddy" and "All I Want for Christmas Dear Is You" were both recorded by Buck Owens on his 1965 album Christmas with Buck Owens and His Buckaroos. "Loving Time of the Year" and "Christmas Just Ain't Christmas Without You" are the only new tracks on this album.

Track listing
"Winter Wonderland" (Felix Bernard, Dick Smith) – 2:50
"Christmas in My Hometown" (Sonny James, John Skye) – 2:43
"Santa Looked a Lot Like Daddy" (Buck Owens, Don Rich) – 2:28
"All I Want for Christmas Dear Is You" (Owens, Rich) – 3:04
"O Little Town of Bethlehem" (Phillips Brooks, Lewis Redner) – 4:55
"Loving Time of the Year" (Travis Tritt) – 4:06
"Christmas Just Ain't Christmas Without You" (Johnny Neel) – 4:33
"I Heard the Bells on Christmas Day" (Henry Wadsworth Longfellow, Johnny Marks) – 4:10
"Silver Bells" (Jay Livingston, Ray Evans) – 5:18
"Have Yourself a Merry Little Christmas" (Hugh Martin, Ralph Blane) – 6:05

Chart performance

References

1992 Christmas albums
Christmas albums by American artists
Travis Tritt albums
Warner Records albums
Country Christmas albums